The 2017 The Citadel Bulldogs football team represented The Citadel, The Military College of South Carolina in the 2017 NCAA Division I FCS football season. The Bulldogs were led by second-year head coach Brent Thompson and played their home games at Johnson Hagood Stadium. They were members of the Southern Conference. They finished the season 5–6, 3–5 in SoCon play to finish in a tie for sixth place.

Previous season
The Bulldogs finished the 2016 season 10–2, 8–0 in SoCon play to claim their fourth conference championship.  This was the first time a Citadel football team completed an 8–0 record in conference play.  The Bulldogs appeared in the FCS Playoffs for the fifth time, but were defeated in their first game after earning a bye to the second round.

Preseason

Preseason media poll
The SoCon released their preseason media poll on July 18, 2017, with the Bulldogs predicted to finish in second place, with six of 22 voters picking The Citadel first. The same day the coaches released their preseason poll with the Bulldogs also predicted to finish in second place.

Preseason All-SoCon Teams
The Bulldogs placed five players on the preseason all-SoCon teams, and Kailik Williams was named as preseason Defensive Player of the Year.

Defensive Player of the Year

Kailik Williams – DB

Offense

1st team

Cam Jackson – RB
Tyler Davis – OL

Defense

1st team

Kailik Williams – DB

2nd team

Ken Allen – DL
Jonathan King – DL

Schedule

Roster

Game summaries

Newberry

at Presbyterian

at East Tennessee State

at Samford

Mercer

Wofford

at Chattanooga

VMI

Western Carolina

at Furman

at Clemson

Ranking movements

References

Citadel
The Citadel Bulldogs football seasons
2017 in sports in South Carolina